The University of Applied Arts Vienna (or informally just Die Angewandte) is an arts university and institution of higher education in Vienna, the capital of Austria. It has had university status since 1970.

History
The predecessor of the Angewandte was founded in 1863 as the k. k. Kunstgewerbeschule (Vienna School of Arts and Crafts), following the example of the South Kensington Museum in London, now the Victoria & Albert Museum, to set up a place of advanced education for designers and craftsmen with the Arts and Crafts School in Vienna. It was closely associated with the Österreichischen Museums für Kunst und Industrie (Imperial Royal Austrian Museum of Art and Industry, today known as the MAK).

It was the first school of its kind on the continent. In 1941 it became an institution of higher education. 1941-45 it was called "Reichshochschule fuer angewandte Kunst", and in 1948 was taken over by the Austrian state as an academy. In 1970 it was awarded the title of a university and in 1998 it was renamed the Universität für angewandte Künste (University of applied arts).

Famous artists such as Gustav Klimt, Oskar Kokoschka, Koloman Moser, Vivienne Westwood, Karl Lagerfeld, Jean-Charles de Castelbajac, Paul Kirnig, Jil Sander, Pipilotti Rist, Matteo Thun, François Valentiny, Hugo Markl and Stefan Sagmeister were part of the university's staff or student body. Today its faculty includes many distinguished artists and teachers, such as Judith Eisler, Erwin Wurm, Hartmut Esslinger, Hani Rashid (of Asymptote Architecture), Greg Lynn, Wolf D Prix (of Coop Himmelb(l)au), Peter Weibel and the philosopher Burghart Schmidt.

Present
The university has currently ca. 1,800 students and c. 380 faculty. The students come from 70 different countries to study in the 29 disciplines of the school, structured in 60% Austrians, 25% Europeans and 15% from other countries. The outcome of their processes is made public in ca. 200 exhibitions a year and a multitude of different events and other public presentations.

Notable alumni
Notable alumni from the university are
 Walter Bosse (1904–1979), modernist brass sculpture
 Dorrit Dekk (1917-–2014), graphic designer, printmaker and artist
 Augusta Kochanowska (1868–1927), Polish painter and illustrator
 Brigitte Kowanz (born 1957), artist
 Matthias Laurenz Gräff (born 1984), artist
Wiktoria Goryńska (1902 - 1945)
 Gustav Klimt (studied 1876 - 1883) 
 Hugo Markl (born 1964), artist
 Pipilotti Rist (born 1962), visual artist
 Felice Rix-Ueno (1893-1967), textile artist
 Stefan Sagmeister (born 1962), designer
 Stylianos Schicho (born 1977), artist
 Eva Schlegel (born 1960), artist and professor at the Academy of Fine Arts Vienna
 Pola Stout (1902–1984), textile designer
 Wolfgang Hoffmann (1900-1969), architect and designer
 Ernestine Tahedl (born 1940), artist
 Matthias Tarasiewicz (born 1979), curator and researcher
 Leo Wollner (1925–1995), textile designer
 Erwin Wurm (born 1954), artist
 Lisbeth Zwerger (born 1954), illustrator
 Andreas Kronthaler (born 1966), designer for, and husband to Vivienne Westwood
 Karl Hagenauer(1898–1956), Austrian designer in the Art Deco style

See also
 Vocational universities
 Höhere Graphische Bundes-Lehr- und Versuchsanstalt

References

External links

 University official website (German and English)
 Museum of Applied Arts (MAK) official website (German and English)
 Information about art universities, translation based on the "Austria Lexicon"
 Study in Austria: A Guide

 
Educational institutions established in 1867
1867 establishments in the Austrian Empire
Universities and colleges in Vienna
Culture in Vienna
Art schools in Austria
Arts organizations established in 1867
Universities established in the 1970s